Our Community is an Australian social entrepreneurship body set up to build capacity in Australia's 600,000 community groups and grantmaking bodies.

The Our Community Group comprises a number of different enterprises, including the Institute of Community Directors Australia, the Funding Centre, Good Jobs, and the Australian Institute of Grants Management.

Our Community has published a series of manuals on such issues as board management, marketing, advocacy, financial management and charitable fundraising. Since 2004 it has organised an annual policy conference for the Australian voluntary sector - Communities in Control - and offers a library of thousands of online helpsheets on a range of not-for-profit topics.

In addition to its role as a leading social enterprise in Australia, Our Community has also established GiveNow.com.au through its not-for-profit arm, the Our Community Foundation, allowing not-for-profit organisations throughout Australia to accept online donations at no cost to themselves.

In 2009, Our Community launched SmartyGrants, a cloud-based grants management administration software tool that is used by hundreds of local, state and federal government, philanthropic and corporate grantmakers to receive applications and manage their funding programs.

The company was founded in 2000 by Denis Moriarty, its current managing director, who received a Centenary Medal in recognition for establishing Our Community.  It is chaired by prominent social investor and Reserve Bank of Australia member Carol Schwartz AO. In the past, it had Rhonda Galbally AO as its CEO.

In 2007, Our Community was named the winner of the "Cool Company" Social Capitalist Award, where the organisation was described as a "deeply noble enterprise."

There are over 55,000 community and not-for-profit groups involved with Our Community ranging from large organisations such as Oxfam Australia, to small ones such as Partners in Aid.

References

External links
 Our Community website
 B Labs
 Australia's Nonprofit Sector
 Oxfam Australia website
 Partners in Aid website

Charities based in Australia